The Ultimate Task, also known as Fantastic Adventure, is a 2013 Chinese animated adventure comedy drama film directed by Sun Lijun. It was released on July 20, 2013.

Voice cast
Xie Na
Lu Zhixing
Han Tongsheng
Wang Jinsong
Li Yang
Liu Jing
Yang Yifei

Reception
The film earned  at the Chinese box office.

References

External links

2013 animated films
2013 films
2010s adventure films
2013 comedy-drama films
Animated adventure films
Animated comedy films
Animated drama films
Chinese animated films